This is a list of airlines currently operating in Tajikistan.

Scheduled airlines

Cargo airlines

See also
 List of airlines
 List of defunct airlines of Tajikistan
 List of defunct airlines of Asia

Tajikistan
Airlines
Airlines
Tajikistan